Perole is a census town and part of Nileshwaram Municipality in Hosdurg taluk of Kasaragod district in Kerala, India. Perole is located 1.5 km east of Nileshwaram town.

Demographics
As of 2011 Indian census, Perole had population of 14,965 of which 7,125 are males and 7,840 are females. Perole census town spreads over an area of 13.61 km2 with 3,748 families residing in it. The sex ratio of Perole was 1,100 higher than state average of 1,084. In Perole, population of children under 6 years was 9%. Perole had overall literacy of 91.9% lower than state average of 94%. The male literacy stands at 96.3% and female literacy was 87.9%.

Administration
Perole is a part of Nileshwaram Municipality. Perole is politically part of Kanhangad (State Assembly constituency) under Kasaragod (Lok Sabha constituency).

Transportation
National Highway 66 passes through Nileshwaram town connects Mangalore and Mumbai in the northern side and Kochi and Thiruvananthapuram in the southern side. The nearest railway station is Nileshwar railway station.

References

Nileshwaram area